Małgorzata Maria Dzieduszycka-Ziemilska (born on June 1, 1949 in Krakow) is a Polish publicist, theater critic and the Consul General in Montreal from 1992 to 1996.

She graduated from Polish Studies at the University of Wrocław. Her master's thesis about the Theater of Jerzy Grotowski appeared in print and was the first book about Grotowski published in Poland.

In the years 1974–1981, a collaborator of ITD, Kultura, Polityka and Dialog. In the years 1981–1990 she was the head of the literary theater "Kalambur" in Wrocław and the "Studio" Theater in Warsaw. She ran a foreign department in the magazine Teatr. She was the organizer of international avant-garde theater festivals in Wrocław.

In 1990, she was appointed as an adviser to the Minister of Culture and became the representative of Poland in the Council of Europe's Culture Committee, as well as the general secretary of the Polish branch of the European Culture Foundation. In 1992, she was appointed Consul General in Montreal, where she held this position until autumn 1996. 

She was the co-founder of the Polish-Canadian Committee for Dialogue, focusing on Polish-Jewish cooperation. From 2000 to 2003 she was a permanent representative of the Republic of Poland to UNESCO in Paris. Member of the Polish Committee for UNESCO.

She has two sons: Wojciech and Paweł with her husband, Andrzej Ziemilski (1923–2003). She comes from a family that used to wear the coat of arms of Sas. 

She translated the book "Witness: Passing the Torch of Holocaust Memory to New Generations" by  Eli Rubenstein into Polish. The book is a compilation of images and reflections, from the Holocaust survivors and students who participated in the March of the Living. Along with Canadian writer, Irene Tomaszewski, she was very instrumental in encouraging contact and dialogue between Jewish students and Polish students during the annual March of the Living program.

Publications

Tysiąc wiatrów w biegu (translation: Thousand winds on the run), Warszawa: Państwowy Instytut Wydawniczy, 2015.
Idiomy angielskie: słownik (translation: English Idioms: Dictionary), Warszawa: Wiedza Powszechna, 2001, 2005, 2009.
Ameryka z miłością i złością (translation: America with love and anger), Wrocław: Wydawnictwo Dolnośląskie, 1989.
Apocalypsis cum figuris: opis spektaklu Jerzego Grotowskiego (translation: Apocalypsis cum figuris: description of the performance directed by Jerzy Grotowski), Kraków: Wydawnictwo Literackie, 1974.

References

Bibliography

 Tadeusz Kosobudzki: MSZ od A do Z. Ludzie i sprawy Ministerstwa Spraw zagranicznych w latach 1990–1995. Warszawa: Wydawnictwo'69, 1997, s. 97–98. .

1949 births
Polish publicists
University of Wrocław alumni
Polish translators
Living people
Consuls-General of Poland
Permanent Representatives of Poland to the United Nations
Diplomats from Kraków